West Fork Little Thompson River is a tributary of the Little Thompson River in northern Colorado.  It flows from a source in Roosevelt National Forest southwest of Twin Sisters Peaks to a confluence with the Little Thompson.

See also
 List of rivers of Colorado

References

Rivers of Colorado
Rivers of Larimer County, Colorado
Tributaries of the Platte River
Rivers of Boulder County, Colorado